The Autostrada A11 also known as Firenze - Mare, is an Italian motorway which connects Florence to Pisa.  Chronologically it is the second oldest Italian highway, built during the Fascist period. The Autostrada A11 it is currently operated by Autostrade per l'Italia.

References

Buildings and structures completed in 1933
Autostrade in Italy
Transport in Tuscany

1933 establishments in Italy